ARPA – Aerolíneas Paraguayas was an airline with its headquarters on the grounds of Silvio Pettirossi International Airport in Luque, Paraguay, near Asunción. It operated scheduled domestic services. Its main base was Silvio Pettirossi International Airport.

History

Aerolíneas Paraguayas was founded on May 14, 1994, with an inauguration ceremony at Silvio Pettirossi International Airport. The first regular flights took place on May 16, 1994, with a fleet composed of three Cessna A208 Caravan 1. ARPA was the first investment of TAM Linhas Aéreas in Paraguay.

At the beginning, ARPA had flights to the most important cities in Paraguay, like Ciudad del Este, Pedro Juan Caballero, Concepción and Encarnación. Eventually, it also flew to Ayolas and Filadelfia (Chaco). In 1995, ARPA received a Cessna Citation II jet to compete with LADESA (Líneas Aéreas del Este S.A.) BAe Jetstream 31s which also covered the route to Ciudad del Este.

On September 1, 1996, ARPA purchased 80% of the majority shares of Líneas Aéreas Paraguayas. It was sold to its parent company a month later, rebranded as TAM Mercosur. 

Some routes were discontinued due to the poor passenger traffic. By the late 1990s, ARPA was only flying to Ciudad del Este regularly. In the early 2000s, ARPA operated 2 Cessna 208B Gran Caravans.

In December 2002, ARPA was merged with TAM Mercosur. The two Caravans continued operations with TAM and were withdrawn from service a year later.

Destinations
ARPA served the following cities:

Asunción - Silvio Pettirossi International Airport
Ciudad del Este - Guaraní International Airport
Pedro Juan Caballero - Dr. Augusto Roberto Fuster Airport

Fleet
3 Cessna 208B Grand Caravan (Leased from TAM Express)
1 Cessna 550 Citation II (Operated by TAM Aviação Executiva)

See also
List of defunct airlines of Paraguay

References

External links

Defunct airlines of Paraguay
Airlines established in 1994
Airlines disestablished in 2002
1994 establishments in Paraguay
2002 disestablishments in Paraguay